Alberto Blanco Fernández (born 17 February 1950) is a Cuban weightlifter. He competed in the middle heavyweight and First heavyweight class, representing Cuba at international competitions. He won the bronze medal at the 1977, 1979 and 1980 World Weightlifting Championships. He won the bronze medal at the 1980 Summer Olympics in the 100 kg event. He also participated at the 1976 Summer Olympics. He won the gold medal at the 1979 Pan American Games in the Sub-Heavyweight class (357.5 kg).

References

External links
 
 
 

1950 births
Living people
Cuban male weightlifters
Olympic weightlifters of Cuba
Olympic bronze medalists for Cuba
Olympic medalists in weightlifting
Weightlifters at the 1976 Summer Olympics
Weightlifters at the 1980 Summer Olympics
Medalists at the 1980 Summer Olympics
World Weightlifting Championships medalists
Pan American Games gold medalists for Cuba
Pan American Games medalists in weightlifting
Weightlifters at the 1979 Pan American Games
Place of birth missing (living people)
Medalists at the 1979 Pan American Games
20th-century Cuban people
21st-century Cuban people